Calymne relicta is a species of sea urchins of the Family Calymnidae. Their armour is covered with spines. Calymne relicta was first scientifically described in 1877 by Thomson.

See also 

 Calveriosoma gracile
 Calveriosoma hystrix
 Cassidulus caribaearum

References 

Animals described in 1877
Holasteroida